William Charles Utermohlen (December 5, 1933 – March 21, 2007) was an American figurative artist known for his late-period self-portraits completed after his 1995 diagnosis of probable Alzheimer's disease. He had developed progressive memory loss beginning about four years before his diagnosis in 1995, and during that time began a series of self-portraits influenced in part by the figurative painter Francis Bacon and cinematographers from the movement of German Expressionism.

Born to first-generation German immigrants in South Philadelphia, Utermohlen earned a scholarship at the Philadelphia Academy of Fine Arts (PAFA) in 1951.  After completing military service, he spent 1953 studying in Western Europe where he was inspired by Renaissance and Baroque artists. He moved to London in 1962 and married the art historian Patricia Redmond in 1965. He relocated to Massachusetts in 1972 to teach art at Amherst College before returning to London in 1975.

Utermohlen died in obscurity on March 21, 2007, aged 73, but his late works have gained posthumous renown. His self-portraits especially are seen as important in the understanding of the gradual effects of neurocognitive disorders.

Early life 
William Charles Utermohlen was born on December 5, 1933, in Southern Philadelphia, Pennsylvania, as the only child of first-generation German immigrants. At the time, that section of Philadelphia was split along language lines; his family would have been in the German-speaking part of the city, but inward migration across the United States resulted in their living in the Italian bloc. Due to racial tensions, Utermohlen's parents did not allow him to venture outside of his immediate surrounding. Manu Sharma of STIRworld speculates that his parents' protectiveness may have a factor in the development of his artistic creativity.

He earned a scholarship at the Pennsylvania Academy of Fine Arts (PAFA) in 1951 where he studied under the realist artist Walter Stuempfig. Utermohlen completed his military service in 1953, following two years in the Caribbean. Shortly after, he studied in Europe and travelled through Italy, France and Spain where he was heavily influenced by the works of Giotto and Nicolas Poussin. He graduated from PAFA in 1957 and moved to England, in part because he was attracted to the London art scene. Utermohlen's wife, the art historian Patricia Redmond, said that "when he was art school, he was very pretty, and he was chased around by all the homosexual tutors and everybody else... he didn't care but he didn't fancy them. When he came to England he discovered, amazingly, because the English had always been like this, that we quite liked girlish men."

He attended the Ruskin School of Art in Oxford between 1957 and 1959, where he met the American artist R. B. Kitaj. After leaving Ruskin, he returned to the U.S. for three years. He moved to London in 1962 where he met Redmond, whom he married in 1965. In 1969, his artwork was featured in an exhibition at the Marlborough Gallery. From 1972, Utermohlen taught art at the Amherst College in Massachusetts, where Redmond received her master's degree. By 1975 he had returned England, and lived in London where he gained nationality in 1992.

Style
His early works are mostly figurative; although James M. Stubenrauch described Utermohlen's early art as "exuberant, at times surrealistic" style of expressionism. For a period in the late 1970s, as a response to the photorealist movement, he printed photographs onto a canvas and painting directly over the photograph. An example of this technique can be seen in Self-Portrait (Split) (1977). He would employ this technique for two portraits of Redmond.

Regarding Utermohlen's art style, Redmond said to The New York Times that "he was never quite in the same time slot with what was going on. Everybody was Abstract expressionist, [while] he was solemnly drawing the figure." She explained in a Studio 360 interview that Utermohlen was "puzzled and worried, because he couldn't work in [a] totally abstract way," as he considered the figure "incredibly important."

Six cycles

Utermohlen did not explain his work or discuss them with Redmond. She later said that as an art historian, he feared she would interfere with his creative progress. Redmond believes he was "absolutely right" in this approach, and guesses she would have highlighted faults in his work. 
Most of his early paintings can be grouped into six cycles: Mythological (1962–1963), Cantos (or Dante) (1964–1966), Mummers (1969–1970), War (1972–1973), Nudes (1973–1974), and Conversation (1989–1991).

The Mythological series mainly consist of water scenes. The Dante cycle was inspired by Dante's Inferno, while the art style paintings drew influence from pop art. The War series references the Vietnam War; and according to Redmond the inclusion of isolated soldiers represented his feelings of being an outsider in the art scene. Both Mummers and Conversations were based on early memories; the former, completed between 1968 and 1970, is based on the Mummers Parade of Philadelphia. In a letter from November 1970, Utermohlen stated that the cycle was also created as a "vehicle for expressing my anxiety". Redmond described Mummers as "an empathetic vision of the lower classes, but also his own projected self-image".

The Conversations paintings are described by the French psychoanalyst Patrice Polini as Utermohlen's attempt to describe the events of his life before memory loss. They pre-date his diagnosis, and already indicate the onset of a number of symptoms. Titles such as W9 and Maida Vale reference the names of the district and neighborhood, respectively, that he lived in at the time. The artworks themselves contain more saturated colors and "engaging spacial arrangements", which highlight the actions of the people in the artworks.

Alzheimer's, late works

Utermohlen experienced memory loss while working on the Conversation series. His symptoms ranged from being unable to remember how to wrap his necktie to being unable to find his way back to his apartment. Between 1993 and 1994, he produced a series of lithographs depicting short stories written by World War I poet Wilfred Owen. The figures were more still and mask-like than the Conversation pieces. They consist of a series of disoriented and wounded soldiers, and are described by his art dealer Chris Boicos as a seeming premonition of the artist's dementia diagnosis made in the following year. By this time, he was often forgetting to show up for teaching appointments.

In 1994 he took on a commission for a family portrait. Around a year later, Redmond took his client to Utermohlen's studio to see the progress, but saw that the portrait had not advanced since their last viewing nine months earlier. Redmond feared Utermohlen was depressed and sought medical advice. He was diagnosed with probable Alzheimer's disease in August 1995 at the age of 61. He was sent to the Queen's Square Hospital where a nurse, Ron Isaacs, became interested in his drawings and asked him to start drawing self-portraits. The first, Blue Skies, was completed between 1994 and 1995, before his diagnosis, and shows him gripping a yellow table in an empty, sparsely described interior. When his neuropsychologist Sebastian Crutch visited Utermohlen in late 1999, he described the painting as depicting the artist trying to hang on and avoid being "swept out" of the open window above. Polini likened the depiction of him holding onto the table to a painter holding onto his canvas, saying that "[i]n order to survive, he must be able to capture this catastrophic moment; he must depict the unspeakable." Blue Skies became Utermohlen's last "large scale" painting.

That year's sketch, A Welcoming Man, shows a disassembled figure that seems to represent his loss of spatial perception. Regarding the sketch, Crutch et al state that "[Utermohlen] acknowledged that there was a problem with the sketch, but did not know what the problem was nor how it could be rectified." He began a series of self-portraits after his diagnosis in 1995. The earliest, the Masks series, are in watercolor and were completed between 1994 and 2001. His last non-self-portrait dates 1997, and was of Redmond. It was titled by Patrice Polini as Pat (Artist's Wife).

Death
Utermohlen had retired from painting by December 2000, could no longer draw by 2002, and was in the care of the Princess Louise nursing home in 2004. He died of pneumonia at the Hammersmith Hospital on March 21, 2007, aged 73. Redmond said that "really he was dead long before that, Bill died in 2000, when the disease meant he was no longer able to draw."

Later work

Self-portraits

His series of self-portraits became increasingly abstract as his dementia progressed, and according to the critic Anjan Chatterjee, describe "haunting psychological self-expressions." The early stages of the disease had not impacted his ability to paint, despite what was observed by Crutch et al. His cognitive disorder is not believed to have been hereditary; aside from a 1989 car accident which left him unconscious for around 30 minutes, Utermohlen's medical history was described by Crutch as "unremarkable". Redmond covered the mirrors in their house because Utermohlen was afraid of what he saw there, and had stopped using them for self-portraits. After Utermohlen's diagnosis, descriptions of his skull became a key aspect of his self-portraits, while the academic Robert Cook–Deegan noticed how as Utermohlen's condition progressed, he "gradually integrates less colour".

The later self-portraits have thicker brushwork than his earlier works. Writing for the Queen's Quarterly, the journalist Leslie Millin noted that the works became progressively more distorted but less colorful. In Nicci Gerrard's 2019 book, What Dementia Teaches Us About Love, she describes the self-portraits as emotional modernism. Sharma suggests that they depict anosognosia, a condition that results both loss of self-recognition and object-recognition.

In Self Portrait (In The Studio) (1996), frustration and fear are evident in his expressions. Xi Hsu speculates that Utermohlen created this self portrait to express that he did not want to be known for his struggles with dementia, and wanted to be known as an artist. His 1996 Self Portrait (With Easel),{{efn|Also titled Self Portrait I and Self Portrait (With Easel–Yellow and Green)}} shows more confused emotions according to Green et al. Polini describes the appearance of the easel in Self Portrait (With Easel) as akin to prison bars. A 1996 drawing, Broken Figure contains a ghost-like figure which serves as the outline of the fallen body in the drawing. His Self Portrait with Saw (1997) has a serrated carpenter's saw in the far right, which Redmond said invokes an autopsy that would have given a definite diagnosis. Polini noticed how the saw is vertically pointed, similar to a guillotine blade, and wrote that it may symbolise the "approach of a prefigured death". The last self portrait that Utermohlen used a mirror for, Self Portrait (With Easel) (1998) uses the same pose as a 1955 self-portrait. According to Polini, this was the artist's desire to "experience again the old motions of painting."Erased Self Portrait (1999) was his last attempt at a self-portrait using a paint brush. It took nearly two years to complete and is described by the BBC as "almost sponge like and empty". Head I (2000) shows a head portraying eyes, mouth, and a smudge on the left that appears to be an ear; a crack appearing in the centre of the head. The rest of the portraits are of a blank head, one of them erased. Associated Press' Joann Loviglio describes Utermohlen's final self-portraits as the "afterimages of a creative and talented spirit whose identity appears to have vanished."

Influences

Redmond describes these works as influenced by German Expressionism, and compares them to artists such as Ernst Ludwig Kirchner and Emil Nolde. She explained in New Statesman: "It's odd, because he hardly ever thought of his German ancestry, but toward the end he becomes a kind of German abstract expressionist. He might have been quite amused by that, I think."

Shortly after his diagnosis, he and Redmond travelled to Europe and saw Diego Velázquez's 1650 Portrait of Pope Innocent X, which lead to an interest in Francis Bacon's distorted 1953 version Study after Velázquez's Portrait of Pope Innocent X. After his return to England in 1996, he painted Self Portrait (In the Studio), which includes the screaming mouth, a motif borrowed from Bacon's work.

A 2015 Scientific American article which mentioned both Bacon and Utermohlen called Bacon's "distorted faces and disfigured bodies" disturbing.  It noted that his works are "so distorted that they violate the brain's expectations for the body", and went on to discuss the possibility that Bacon had dysmorphopsia. When describing Utermohlen's portraits, the writer said that Utermohlen's portraits  offered "a window into the artist's" decline, adding that they were "also heartbreaking in that they expose[d] a mind trying against hope to understand itself despite deterioration".

Legacy
Utermohlen's self-portraits first gained attention after they were described in The Lancets 2001 case report when the Crutch et al noted that the evident change in artistic ability was "indicative of a process above and beyond normal aging, particularly given his relatively young age at onset". The article further noted that, over five years, the self-portraits showed an "objective deterioration in the quality of the artwork produced". They concluded that the portraits offered "a testament to the resilience of human creativity". Crutch himself said that Utermohlen's works were "more eloquent than anything he could have said with words".

According to Hsu, the portraits are the "highlight of his career". Commenters liken them to those of Vincent van Gogh, Pablo Picasso, and Edvard Munch. Sharma compared the self-portraits to the works of English painter Ivan Seal, noting that the latter's works show objects that "[teeter] on the brink of pure recognition and abstraction." Some writers have also likened the self-portraits to the illustrations of Mervyn Peake; although Demetrios J. Sahlas of Peake Studies noted that Peake's works were different to Utermohlen's, because shown in the works is the "preservation of insight". A 2013  article in The Lancet compared his work to Rembrandts self-portraits, and described Utermohlen as "struggling to preserve his self against age" while also fighting against "inexorable neurodegeneration". Giovanni Frazzetto described Utermohlen's self-portraits as similar to the works of Egon Schiele, explaining that the portraits were "evocative of the shrivelled bodies and diaphanous faces" shown in the latter's work.

Sherri Irvin says that the portraits show "remarkable stylistic features, [rewarding] serious efforts of appreciation and interpretation". Irvin notes that their "formal and aesthetic features", the correlation with Utermohlen's earlier works and their "aptness to interpretation", is what makes the portraits "jointly sufficient to connect them in the right way with past art, [despite] the absence of an express[ed] intention about how they are to be regarded."

Alan E. H. Emery believes that the progressive effects of dementia give neurologists "an opportunity to study how the disease affects an artist's work over time", adding that it also provides a unique method of studying detailed change in perception, and how it can be linked to localised brain functions. He concluded by stating that documenting changes over time with neuroimaging could lead to better understanding of dementia. Medical anthropologist Margaret Lock states that the portraits indicate that "there may be many avenues... that suggest ways in which humans can be protected from the ravages of this condition by means of lifelong social and cultural activities." 

Purcell stated that Utermohlen's artwork provided viewers with a "unique glimpse into the effects of a declining brain." Researchers at Illinois Wesleyan University state that Utermohlen's self portraits show that "people with AD can have a strong voice through images." The existence of his earlier self-portraits (which allowed viewers to create a time-lapse of his mental decline) and the idea that his works give a rare view into the mind of an Alzheimer's patient were two aspects contributing to his growing popularity. The 2019 short film Mémorable was inspired by the self-portraits and nominated for the Academy Award for Best Animated Short Film in 2020.

Exhibitions
Utermohlen had exhibited long before his diagnosis. His paintings were exhibited at the Lee Nordness Gallery in 1968 and the Marlborough Gallery in 1969; in 1972, the Mummers cycle was displayed in Amsterdam. Utermohlen's posthumous portrait of Gerald Penny was featured in the Gerald Penny 77' Center; earlier that year, he had artworks such as Five Figures in the Mead Art Museum. At their peak, sales of Utermohlen's earlier works ranged from $3,000 to $30,000.

His self-portraits have been shown at several exhibitions in the years after his death, including 12 exhibitions from 2006 to 2008. In 2016, the exhibition A Persistence of Memory was shown at the Loyola University Museum of Art in Chicago. The exhibition, which contained 100 artworks from Utermohlen's work, was organised by Pamela Ambrose, who said about his portraits: "If you did not know that this man was suffering from Alzheimer's, you could simply perceive the work as a stylistic change."

Other notable exhibitions include a retrospective at the GV Art gallery in London in 2012, an exhibition at the Chicago Cultural Center in 2008 sponsored by Myriad Pharmaceuticals, and The Later Works of William Utermohlen, shown at the New York Academy of Medicine in 2006, which marked the centenary of Alois Alzheimer first discovering the disease; it was open free to the public. Earlier that year, there was another exhibition at the College of Physicians of Philadelphia. His self-portraits have also been shown in Washington, D.C. in 2007, the Two 10 Gallery in London in 2001, Harvard University at Cambridge, Massachusetts in 2005, Boston, and Los Angeles. The self-portraits were exhibited in Sacramento, California in 2008. Utermohlen's artworks were shown in 2016 at the Kunstmuseum Thun in Switzerland. In February 2007, a month before Utermohlen's death, his self-portraits were exhibited at Wilkes University.

See also
 Everywhere at the End of Time (2016–2019), a series of six concept albums reflecting the stages of dementia
 It's Such a Beautiful Day'' (2012), an experimental film depicting the progressively failing memory and worsening symptoms of the protagonist due to a neurological disease

References

Notes

Citations

Sources

Journals

Bibliography 

 
 
 
 
 
  
 
 
 

1933 births
2007 deaths
American people of German descent
Artists from Philadelphia
Deaths from pneumonia in England
Pennsylvania Academy of the Fine Arts alumni
People with Alzheimer's disease